Tain is a union council situated between Thorar and Pachiot. Tain is the home town of the former president of Azad Kashmir, Muhammad Anwar Khan.

Union councils of Poonch District